Dasht-e Naomid (Persian: دشت ناامید), also Dasht-e Namid, Dasht-e Namadī, or Dasht-e Nāomīd, is a desert in Central Asia, on the Afghanistan-Iran border. It can also be considered part of the Dasht-e Kavir, a large desert in Iran.

Deserts of Afghanistan
Deserts of Iran